Brea de Tajo is a municipality of the autonomous community of Madrid in central Spain. It belongs to the comarca of Las Vegas.

Sights include the church of La Asunción.

References

Municipalities in the Community of Madrid